The Cucuteni is a left tributary of the river Bahlueț in Romania. It flows into the Bahlueț in the town Târgu Frumos.

References

Rivers of Romania
Rivers of Iași County